Riffat is a Muslim name also sometimes given to a Hindus. The meaning of the name Riffat is high, high rank or superiority. Arabic: رفات, Bangla: রিফ্ফাত, Urdu: رافت, Hindi: रिफात. It is not listed in the top 1000 names. People with the name include:

As a given name
Riffat Arif, birth name of Sister Zeph, Pakistani activist
Riffat Aziz, Pakistani politician
Riffat Hassan, Pakistani-American theologian and a leading Islamic feminist scholar of the Qur'an
Riffat Akbar Swati, former member of the provincial assembly from Mansehra District, in the Khyber-Pakhtunkhwa province of Pakistan

As a surname
Rashida Riffat, Pakistani politician
Saffa Riffat, president of the World Society of Sustainable Energy Technology

Arabic feminine given names